Robert John Zastryzny ( born March 26, 1992) is a Canadian-American professional baseball pitcher in the Pittsburgh Pirates organization. He has previously played in MLB for the Chicago Cubs, New York Mets and Los Angeles Angels. He played college baseball for the Missouri Tigers of the University of Missouri.

Early life
Zastryzny was born in Edmonton, Alberta. His family moved to Corpus Christi, Texas, when he was one year old. Zastryzny holds dual Canadian-American citizenship, and was homeschooled.

Career

Amateur career
Zastryzny played for the Calallen High School baseball team as a pitcher and first baseman, but he began to focus on pitching by his junior year. He compiled a 26–4 win–loss record and a 0.71 earned run average (ERA) and 299 strikeouts, including a 17–1 record and a 0.20 ERA and 198 strikeouts in his senior year. He pitched a perfect game during his junior year.

After graduating from Calallen, Zastryzny then enrolled at the University of Missouri, where he played college baseball for the Missouri Tigers. In three years at Missouri, Zastryzny had a 9–19 win–loss record and a 3.79 ERA with 228 strikeouts, the eighth-most in Tigers history.

Chicago Cubs
The Chicago Cubs selected Zastryzny in the second round, with the 41st overall selection, of the 2013 MLB draft. He began his professional career with the Boise Hawks of the Class A-Short Season Northwest League, and was promoted to the Kane County Cougars of the Class A Midwest League. He pitched for the Daytona Cubs of the Class A-Advanced Florida State League in 2014. In 2015, he pitched for the Tennessee Smokies of the Class AA Southern League. After the 2015 regular season, the Cubs assigned Zastryzny to the Mesa Solar Sox of the Arizona Fall League.

Zastryzny began the 2016 season with Tennessee, and received a mid-season promotion to the Iowa Cubs of the Class AAA Pacific Coast League. On August 19, the Cubs promoted him to the major leagues. Zastryzny made 11 appearances for the Cubs to finish 2016, and finished 1-0 with a 1.13 ERA. The Cubs would eventually win the 2016 World Series, ending their 108-year drought. Zastryzny won his first World Series title. Zastryzny was added to the roster for the 2016 National League Championship Series, replacing Tommy La Stella who had been on the roster for the 2016 National League Division Series. Although eligible to play, he did not appear in any NLCS games.  Zastryzny was replaced by Kyle Schwarber on the roster for the 2016 World Series. He was designated for assignment on September 1, 2018. He was outrighted to Iowa on September 3. Zastryzny was released by the Cubs organization on March 25, 2019.

Los Angeles Dodgers
On March 26, 2019, Zastryzny signed a minor league deal with the Los Angeles Dodgers. After the season, on October 8, 2019, he was selected for the Canada national baseball team at the 2019 WBSC Premier12.

Baltimore Orioles
Zastryzny signed a minor league deal with the Baltimore Orioles on November 26, 2019. He spent most of the 2020 season on the team's 60-player Alternate Training Site pool but was released on September 18 without appearing in any games with the Orioles.

Miami Marlins
On March 26, 2021, Zastryzny signed with the Long Island Ducks of the Atlantic League of Professional Baseball. On May 4, prior to the 2021 ALPB season, Zastryzny's contract was purchased by the Miami Marlins. Zastryzny was assigned to the Triple-A Jacksonville Jumbo Shrimp. He elected free agency on November 7, 2021.

New York Mets
On November 29, 2021, Zastryzny signed a minor league deal with the New York Mets. On August 20, 2022, Zastryzny's contract was selected from Triple-A and was promoted to the major league roster. On August 21, Zastryzyny was optioned to AAA Syracuse. On August 22, Zastryzyny was designated for assignment.

Los Angeles Angels
On August 25, 2022, Zastryzny was claimed off waivers by the Los Angeles Angels. On November 18, Zastryzny was non tendered and became a free agent.

Pittsburgh Pirates
On December 22, 2022, Zastryzny signed a minor league deal with the Pittsburgh Pirates.

Personal life
Zastryzny married Natalie Sanchez in 2019.

References

External links

1992 births
Living people
Arizona League Cubs players
Baseball players from Texas
Boise Hawks players
Canada national baseball team players
Canadian emigrants to the United States
Chicago Cubs players
Daytona Cubs players
Iowa Cubs players
Jacksonville Jumbo Shrimp players
Kane County Cougars players
Los Angeles Angels players
Major League Baseball players from Canada
Major League Baseball pitchers
Mesa Solar Sox players
Missouri Tigers baseball players
New York Mets players
Oklahoma City Dodgers players
Sportspeople from Edmonton
Sportspeople from Corpus Christi, Texas
Syracuse Mets players
Tennessee Smokies players
Tulsa Drillers players
2019 WBSC Premier12 players
2023 World Baseball Classic players